Victoria v Commonwealth was an important decision of the High Court of Australia concerning the procedures in section 57 of the Constitution. The decision was one of several by the High Court following the 1974 joint sitting of the Australian Parliament. The High Court held, by majority, that one of the laws passed at the joint sitting - the Petroleum and Minerals Authority Act 1973 - was not valid because the required time had not elapsed between the Senate's first rejection of the law and its being passed a second time by the House of Representatives.

Background 
Section 57 of the Constitution provides the procedure for the breaking of deadlocks between the House of Representatives and the Senate:

During its first term in office, the Whitlam Government held a majority in the House of Representatives but not the Senate, which twice rejected 10 government bills. On 13 December 1973, the Petroleum and Minerals Authority Bill was passed by the House of Representatives and transmitted to the Senate. The government moved a motion to suspend the Standing Orders to allow the Bill to proceed to passage "without delay". The Senate did not pass the motion and instead adjourned debate to later in the day. One the resumption of debate, the Senate resolved to adjourn the debate to the next sitting day. The Senate then adjourned to a date to be fixed which, in due course, became 28 February 1974.

On 14 February 1974, the Governor-General, Sir Paul Hasluck, prorogued the Parliament until 28 February 1974. Pursuant to the Senate's standing orders, all bills lapsed as a result of the prorogation, subject to the Senate resolving to take up the bill once more.

On 7 March 1974, the House of Representatives resolved to send a request to the Senate to resume reconsideration of the Bill. The Senate resumed consideration of the Bill on 19 March 1974 and ultimately rejected it on 2 April 1974.

On 8 April 1974, the House of Representatives again passed the Bill. On 10 April 1974, the Senate adjourned debate on the Bill for 6 months.

On 14 April 1974, the Governor-General dissolved both Houses, citing 6 bills which had been twice rejected by the Senate, including the Petroleum and Minerals Authority Bill. At the double dissolution election in May 1974, the Whitlam government was returned with a slightly reduced majority in the House of Representatives and still without a Senate majority. Following the Senate's further rejection of the bills used as justification for the double dissolution election, an historic joint sitting of the Commonwealth Parliament was convened in August 1974, at which all 6 of the rejected bills which had been cited for the double dissolution were passed.

Argument 
The states of Victoria, New South Wales, Queensland and Western Australia commenced proceedings challenging the validity of the Act. They argued that the Bill had been first rejected by the Senate on 2 April 1974 and that, as a result, the required 3 months had not passed before its second passage by the House of Representatives. Therefore, it was argued, the Bill was not one to which section 57 of the Constitution could apply.

The Commonwealth made several arguments in defence of the validity of the Act:
 that the adjournment of debate on 13 December 1973 was a rejection or failure to pass the law;
 that in determining whether the law was rejected or not passed, regard could be had to statements by Opposition senators about their intention to oppose the law;
 the interval of 3 months referred to in section 57 is calculated from the first passing of the law by the House of Representatives;
 the provisions of section 57 are merely directory, not mandatory;
 the issues are non-justiciable.

Decision 
All members of the Court wrote separate opinions. All members, other than Justice McTiernan, concluded that the Court had jurisdiction. By majority, the Court held that the Act was invalid as it had not met the requirements of section 57 and so should not have been considered and passed at the joint sitting.

Majority 
Chief Justice Barwick and Justices Gibbs, Stephen and Mason held the Act to be invalid. They rejected the Commonwealth's contention that the Senate had failed to pass the Bill when it adjourned on 13 December 1973. Barwick CJ held that the Senate will have failed to pass a bill where the time has come for it to "take a stand with respect to the Bill" and it "merely prevaricates". He concluded that such time had not been reached on 13 December 1973. Justice Gibbs held that section 57 permitted the Senate a "reasonable time" to consider a bill transmitted by the House of Representatives and that it was "impossible to hold" that the Senate had failed to pass the Act on 13 December 1973. Justice Stephen held that the Senate would not have failed to pass a bill as long as it was engaged in the normal process of deliberation upon proposed laws and the deliberative process was not being used for the ulterior purpose of delaying, rather than considering, the proposed law. Justice Mason also held the test to be one of reasonable time for the Senate to consider the law.

Dissent 
Justices McTiernan and Jacobs dissented. Justice McTiernan held that the question of whether a law met the requirements of section 57 was a political question which could not be decided by the High Court. Justice Jacobs considered the controversy to be justiciable and held that section 57 gives to the Senate a period of 3 months in which to pass the proposed law and, if it has not done so, then it has "failed to pass the law" with the period of 3 months to be calculated from when it was first open to the Senate to consider the law.

References 

High Court of Australia cases
1975 in Australian law
1975 in case law
Australian constitutional law